Docking the Boat (or sometimes: To Go Ashore) is a Swedish dark comedy film from 1965 directed by Tage Danielsson. The film stars Gösta Ekman, Monica Zetterlund, Hans Alfredson, Lars Ekborg and Birgitta Andersson. Monica Zetterlund also performed the theme song.

Plot
A group of friends are to celebrate the summer on a small island in the Stockholm Archipelago. The plan is to eat crayfish and drink snaps, a quintessentially Swedish tradition. Some are already in the house on the island (with the food) and the rest of the group arrives by boat (bringing the snaps), but they experience great difficulties while trying to come ashore.  Their only neighbor on the island, an eccentric, Hollywood-obsessed, hot-tempered hermit doesn't make the situation better.

Cast
 Monica Zetterlund as Berit
 Lars Ekborg as Kalle
 Birgitta Andersson as Mona
 Gösta Ekman as Lennart
 Katie Rolfsen as Inez
 Hans Alfredson as Garbo
 Hatte Furuhagen as Walter
 Tage Danielsson as Olsson
 Jim Hughes as Man finding message in bottle

External links

1965 films
1960s Swedish-language films
Films directed by Tage Danielsson
Films set in Sweden
1960s black comedy films
1965 comedy films
1965 drama films
Swedish black comedy films
1960s Swedish films